Federal Center is an at-grade light rail station on the W Line of the RTD Rail system. It is located near the intersection of West 2nd Place and Routt Street, on the grounds of the Denver Federal Center, after which the station is named, in Lakewood, Colorado.

The station opened on April 26, 2013,  on the West Corridor, built as part of the Regional Transportation District (RTD) FasTracks public transportation expansion plan and voter-approved sales tax increase for the Denver metropolitan area.

The station has a large multi-gate bus transfer plaza served by several RTD Bus and Bustang routes and a 1,000 space park and ride lot.

References 

Transportation in Lakewood, Colorado
RTD light rail stations
W Line (RTD)
Railway stations in the United States opened in 2013
2013 establishments in Colorado
Transportation buildings and structures in Jefferson County, Colorado